Steve Germain (born 22 June 1981) is a French footballer who played in the Football League as a forward for Colchester United. He has also represented AS Cannes in France.

Career

Born in Cannes, France, Germain began his football career with his local club AS Cannes. He joined English Football League club Colchester United on loan in April 1999 with a view to a permanent deal. He made six appearances during his month-long loan deal, making his debut on 2 April in a 1–0 home win against Preston North End. He came on as a 71st-minute substitute for Jason Dozzell, aged 17.

Germain joined Colchester permanently following his loan spell, but struggled to break into the first-team. He made nine appearances in total for the U's without scoring a goal, his last game coming on 18 September 1999 in a 3–0 away defeat to Burnley, a game in which Germain started, being substituted for Lomana LuaLua after 52 minutes.

Following his Colchester exit, Germain returned to France, joining AS Auch Gascogne.

References

1981 births
Living people
Sportspeople from Cannes
French footballers
Association football forwards
Expatriate footballers in England
AS Cannes players
Colchester United F.C. players
English Football League players
Footballers from Provence-Alpes-Côte d'Azur